Laurentides - Located in southern Quebec, Canada, north of the St. Lawrence River and Ottawa River, rising to a highest point of 1166 metres (3,825 ft)
 Appalaches - Physiographic region consisting of thirteen provinces of which a few are in Quebec: the Atlantic Coast Uplands, Eastern Newfoundland Atlantic, Maritime Acadian Highlands, Maritime Plain, Notre Dame and Mégantic Mountains, Western Newfoundland Mountains, Saint Lawrence Valley, New England province
 Collines Montérégiennes - Linear chain of isolated hills in Montreal and the Montérégie, between the Laurentians and the Appalachians

Mountain ranges of Quebec
Quebec, List of mountain ranges of
Mountain ranges
Landforms of Quebec
Mountains of Quebec